Chilognatha is a subclass of the class Diplopoda, which includes the vast majority of extant millipedes, about 12,000 species.

Taxonomy
The classification of Chilognatha presented below is based on Shear, 2011, and Shear & Edgecombe, 2010 (extinct groups). Recent cladistic and molecular studies have challenged the traditional classification schemes above, and in particular the position of the orders Siphoniulida and Polyzoniida is not yet well established. The placement and positions of extinct groups (†) known only from fossils is tentative and not fully resolved. After each name is listed the author citation: the name of the person who coined the name or defined the group, even if not at the current rank.

 Subclass Chilognatha Latrielle, 1802
 Order †Zosterogrammida Wilson, 2005 (Chilognatha incertae sedis)
 Infraclass Pentazonia Brandt, 1833 
 Order †Amynilyspedida Hoffman, 1969
 Superorder Limacomorpha Pocock, 1894 
 Order Glomeridesmida Cook, 1895 
 Superorder Oniscomorpha Pocock, 1887 
 Order Glomerida Brandt, 1833 
 Order Sphaerotheriida Brandt, 1833
 Infraclass Helminthomorpha Pocock, 1887
 Superorder †Archipolypoda Scudder, 1882
 Order †Archidesmida Wilson & Anderson 2004
 Order †Cowiedesmida Wilson & Anderson 2004
 Order †Euphoberiida Hoffman, 1969
 Order †Palaeosomatida Hannibal & Krzeminski, 2005
 Order †Pleurojulida Schneider & Werneburg, 1998 (possibly sister to Colobognatha)
 Subterclass Colobognatha Brandt, 1834 
 Order Platydesmida Cook, 1895
 Order Polyzoniida Cook, 1895 
 Order Siphonocryptida Cook, 1895
 Order Siphonophorida Newport, 1844
 Subterclass Eugnatha Attems, 1898
 Superorder Juliformia Attems, 1926
 Order Julida Brandt, 1833
 Order Spirobolida Cook, 1895
 Order Spirostreptida Brandt, 1833
Superfamily †Xyloiuloidea Cook, 1895 (Sometimes aligned with Spirobolida)
 Superorder Nematophora Verhoeff, 1913 
 Order Callipodida Pocock, 1894
 Order Chordeumatida Pocock 1894
 Order Stemmiulida Cook, 1895
 Order Siphoniulida Cook, 1895
 Superorder Merocheta Cook, 1895
 Order Polydesmida Pocock, 1887

References

Millipedes
Arthropod subclasses